The 1965 NFL playoffs determined the champion of the National Football League in professional American football for its  season. Although a single championship game between conference winners was the current format for the league, a tie in the Western Conference standings between the Green Bay Packers and Baltimore Colts necessitated a rare tiebreaker playoff, the first in the league in seven years and the first in the Western conference since 1957. A coin flip decided the home team.
The teams had played twice during the regular season and Green Bay had won both: 20–17 in Milwaukee on September 26, and 42–27 in Baltimore on December 12.

Both teams were hampered on offense without their starting quarterbacks. Colts Johnny Unitas and Gary Cuozzo were both sidelined with injuries, and newly signed replacements Ed Brown and George Haffner were ruled ineligible by the league owners, so fifth-year running back Tom Matte, a quarterback in college at Ohio State, was thrust into service behind center. Defensive back Bobby Boyd, a one-time Oklahoma quarterback, assumed the back-up role. Packers QB Bart Starr was injured (ribs) on the first play, so veteran Zeke Bratkowski played the rest of the game, backed up by halfback Paul Hornung and safety Willie Wood. Tied at 10 points at the end of regulation, the game went into overtime for over 13 minutes. At the time, it was the longest game in NFL history. Green Bay kicker Don Chandler made a controversial field goal late in regulation (22 yards), which video replays confirmed was wide to the right by a substantial margin. He then booted the winning 25-yarder in overtime.

Although the championship game was played in 1966 on January 2, it is recognized as part of the 1965 NFL season. It was the latest date for an NFL Championship Game to that point, and the first time in league history that the game was held after all of the college bowl games.

The Playoff Bowl (a consolation game between the conference runners-up) for the 1965 season took place in Miami on January 9, 1966, the Sunday following the NFL championship game. With Matte at quarterback, the Colts defeated the Dallas Cowboys 35–3; the rusty Cowboys' previous game was three weeks earlier, on December 19. This capped a season where the Western Conference won 15 out of 16 interconference games against the Eastern Conference, including the championship game and Playoff Bowl.

It was used that year in the Coastal Division, where Baltimore (11–1–2) tied with Los Angeles for the best overall record in the league, but was left out of the postseason, which consisted of the four division winners only; the wild card team was introduced in 1970 with the realignment of the AFL–NFL merger. The American Football League (AFL) had two tiebreaker playoff games, the last in 1968.

Tournament bracket

Both games were at Lambeau Field in Green Bay, Wisconsin

Western Conference playoff

NFL Championship Game

References

Playoffs
1965